Mohammadabad, also known as Moḩammadābād-e Arba‘eh, is a village in Tankaman-e Jonubi Rural District of Tankaman District of Nazarabad County, Alborz province, Iran. At the 2006 census, its population was 448 in 115 households. The most recent census in 2016 counted 781 people in 232 households; it is the largest village in its rural district.

References 

Nazarabad County

Populated places in Alborz Province

Populated places in Nazarabad County